Godfrey Murray (born 6 August 1950) is a Jamaican hurdler. He competed in the men's 110 metres hurdles at the 1972 Summer Olympics. Murray won a bronze medal in the 110 metres hurdles at the 1970 British Commonwealth Games and finished fourth in the 110 metres hurdles at the 1971 Pan American Games.

References

External links
 

1950 births
Living people
Athletes (track and field) at the 1972 Summer Olympics
Jamaican male hurdlers
Olympic athletes of Jamaica
Athletes (track and field) at the 1970 British Commonwealth Games
Commonwealth Games bronze medallists for Jamaica
Commonwealth Games medallists in athletics
Athletes (track and field) at the 1971 Pan American Games
Pan American Games competitors for Jamaica
Place of birth missing (living people)
Medallists at the 1970 British Commonwealth Games